Nord's tenth constituency is a French legislative constituency in the Nord département (in the far North of France). It is one of twenty-one in that département, and covers two cantons (Tourcoing-Nord, and Tourcoing-Nord-Est), which together constitute part of the town of Tourcoing. (The southern part of the town of Tourcoing is part of Nord's 9th constituency.)

Deputies

Election results

2022

 
 
 
 
 
 
 
 
|-
| colspan="8" bgcolor="#E9E9E9"|
|-

2017

2012
Following repeated homophobic statements by incumbent MP Christian Vanneste, the Union for a Popular Movement once more withdrew its endorsement of him (as it had done in 2007), but this time (unlike 2007) stood a candidate against him. Vanneste stood as the candidate of the Rally for France, a minor party of which he was the president since March 2012.

Vanneste was eliminated in the first round of the vote, finishing fourth with 13.18%. The Socialist and UMP candidates were qualified for the runoff, receiving respectively 30.69% and 25.06% of the vote.

 
 
 
 
 
 
 
|-
| colspan="8" bgcolor="#E9E9E9"|
|-

2007
Christian Vanneste, the incumbent MP for the Union for a Popular Movement, lost the endorsement of his party after making repeated homophobic remarks. He had said in particular that homosexuality was an "acquired habit" which could be lost through "reeducation"; that homosexuality was "sectarian", inherently "narcissistic" and a "threat to the survival of humanity"; and that all homosexuals were "heterophobic" Such comments are rare in France, and drew widespread condemnation. The UMP did not allow him to stand as its candidate, but it did not stand a candidate against him. Vanneste stood as the candidate of the National Centre of Independents and Peasants, an associate party of the UMP. After his successful reelection, he was fully reintegrated into the UMP, and sat as one of its members in Parliament.

 
 
 
 
 
 
 
|-
| colspan="8" bgcolor="#E9E9E9"|
|-

2002

 
 
 
 
|-
| colspan="8" bgcolor="#E9E9E9"|
|-

1997

 
 
 
 
 
 
 
 
|-
| colspan="8" bgcolor="#E9E9E9"|
|-

References

Sources
 Official results of French elections from 1998: 

10